Shrimp is a 2018 short comedy-drama film written and directed by Zelda Williams. It stars Conor Leslie, Paulina Singer, and Williams as dominatrixes in a Los Angeles BDSM den. The title of the film is a reference to the term given to the dominatrixes' male clients.

The film premiered at the Tribeca Film Festival on September 22, 2018. Following its premiere, the rights to Shrimp were purchased by Gunpowder & Sky to develop the film into a series.

Plot
Dominatrixes Sasha, Jess, and Angelina work under the supervision of head mistress Marie at a BDSM den, where they inflict pain and humiliation upon their male clients. Jess is a free-spirited exhibitionist and Angelina is married to a client, while Sasha has avoided relationships because of her occupation. Wanting to change Sasha's outlook, Marie sets her up with a blind date she tells Sasha is her friend's son.

After completing their shifts, Sasha meets her date Daniel at a bar, Jess engages in cunnilingus with a young woman in the bar's restroom, and Angelina and her husband enjoy a private romantic evening. Sasha and Daniel remain at the bar until closing and Daniel convinces Sasha to accompany him to a park. The two spend the night together and fall asleep on a bench.

The next morning, Angelina is attacked by a client, but Sasha rescues her. Sasha's actions earn praise from Marie and she asks Sasha to leave the den with her when it closes for the day. Upon stepping outside, the two women encounter Daniel, who is revealed as Marie's son. Put in an awkward position by this revelation, Sasha finds herself at a loss for words.

Cast
 Conor Leslie as Sasha
 Zelda Williams as Jess
 Paulina Singer as Angelina
 Frances Fisher as Marie
 Jake Abel as Daniel
 Jacob Zachar as Angelina's husband
 Danielle Campbell as Jess' date

Additionally, Taika Waititi portrays a bartender and co-producer Joshua Thurston plays Marie's client, referred to as the horse gimp. Sasha Lane has an uncredited appearance as one of the dominatrixes.

Production
Writer/director Zelda Williams stated that she was inspired to create Shrimp after a man at a bar mistook her for a dominatrix. Following a look into a local BDSM den, Williams found the den to be "a different world" from fictional portrayals prior to her film. Describing the dens as "incredibly understanding" and "non-judgmental", Williams commented that their foundation is based "on consent and openness".

Potential television series
After Shrimp premiered at the Tribeca Film Festival, Williams entered into a deal with Gunpowder & Sky in November 2018 to develop the short film into a half-hour series. Gunpowder & Sky CEO Van Toffler said the company was drawn to the film because Williams "was able to take a generally taboo topic, turn it on its head and tap into the day-to-day happenings of the dominatrix community and tell their story in an authentic way".

References

External links
 

2018 films
2018 short films
2018 comedy-drama films
American comedy-drama films
American independent films
American drama short films
2018 independent films
BDSM in films
2010s English-language films
2010s American films